Behlen Observatory  is a research facility and astronomical observatory owned and operated by the astronomy department of  the University of Nebraska-Lincoln.

See also 
List of observatories

References

External links
Behlen Observatory Clear Sky Clock Observing conditions forecast.

Astronomical observatories in Nebraska
University of Nebraska–Lincoln
Buildings and structures in Saunders County, Nebraska
Tourist attractions in Saunders County, Nebraska